Goethepark is a public park in Wedding, a locality of Mitte, Berlin, Germany. The park was created and constructed from 1922–1924. To the west is the Plötzensee and its surrounding park.

References 

Mitte
Pages translated from German Wikipedia
Parks in Berlin
Johann Wolfgang von Goethe